Nauru International Airport  is the sole airport in the Republic of Nauru. The airport connects to other island nations, served by Nauru's national airline, Nauru Airlines.

History 
The airstrip was built during the World War II Japanese occupation of Nauru using forced labour. Operations began in January 1943. After the war, it was converted to a civilian airport.

The airport is located in the Yaren district, just north of many of the government buildings, including the Parliament House, police station, and a secondary school. The airport holds the head office of flag carrier, Nauru Airlines.

Also located at the airport are the Republic of Nauru Civil Aviation Authority, tasked with airport security and operational management; the Directorate of Immigration, tasked with control of incoming and outgoing passengers, and the Nauru Customs Service.

Airlines and destinations
Nauru International Airport serves as the main hub of the national carrier, Nauru Airlines.

References

External links

 Nauru Airlines (formerly Air Nauru)

Airports in Nauru
Airport
Airports established in 1943
1943 establishments in Nauru